Lubowa is a location in Wakiso District of the Central Region of Uganda. It is a suburb of Kampala, the capital of Uganda and the largest city in that country.

Location
Lubowa is bordered by Kabowa to the north, Najjanankumbi and Makindye to the northeast, Munyonyo to the east, Kaazi to the southeast, Kajjansi to the south, Nakigalala to the west, and Buddo to the west.

Points of interest
The following points of interest are located in Lubowa:
 Galaxy International School Uganda (GISU) – The school provides international education to students between 2 and 19 years of age. From kindergarten to year 13 students are taught using student-centred methods. Emphasis is on the development of the whole person. Students in years 10 and 11 are prepared for the International General Certificate of Secondary Education (IGCSE) examination and those in years 12 and 13 are prepared for Cambridge A level examination.
 Roofings Limited – Manufacturer of roofing Materials, with about 1,000 employees.
 International School of Uganda (ISU) – A private high school, catering primarily to the children of diplomats and expatriate staff in Uganda.
 Christian Congregation of Jehovah's Witnesses - The Uganda Branch Office of Jehovah's Witnesses.
 African Bible University (Uganda) - One of the universities in Uganda.
 The second campus of International Health Sciences University (IHSU), a private university in Uganda.
 Uganda International Specialized Hospital (In development).

See also

References

External links
Roofings Limited Homepage
Chatsworth Park Lubowa Homepage
International School of Uganda Homepage

Populated places in Central Region, Uganda
Ssabagabo
Wakiso District